DXKO may refer to:
 DXKO-AM, an AM radio station broadcasting in Cagayan de Oro, branded as Radyo Ronda
 DXKO-FM, an FM radio station broadcasting in Digos, branded as Gold FM
 DXKO-TV, a TV station broadcasting in Cagayan de Oro